Bower is an extinct town in Braxton County, in the U.S. state of West Virginia. The GNIS classifies it as a populated place.

History
A post office called Bower was established in 1906, and remained in operation until 1941. The community had the name of Henry Bower, a railroad official.

References

Geography of Braxton County, West Virginia